Charles Frederick Lloyd (27 September 1906 – 1979) was an English footballer who played for Preston Colliery, Percy Main Amateurs, Hull City, Mansfield Town and Southend United.

References

1906 births
1979 deaths
English footballers
Association football defenders
English Football League players
Mansfield Town F.C. players
Southend United F.C. players
Loughborough Corinthians F.C. players
Hull City A.F.C. players
Ripley Town F.C. players
Percy Main Amateurs F.C. players